Bryan David González Guzmán (born 23 February 2003) is a Chilean professional footballer who plays as a centre back for Chilean club Universidad Católica.

Club career

Universidad Catolica
González made his professional debut playing for Universidad Catolica in a 2021 Copa Chile match against Unión San Felipe on 19 June 2022.

International career
In the 2022 South American Games, he made 3 appearances for Chile U20. In 2023, he took part of the Chile squad in the South American U-20 Championship, but he made no appearances.

Career statistics

Club

References

External links
 

2003 births
Living people
Footballers from Santiago
Chilean footballers
Chile under-20 international footballers
Association football forwards
Chilean Primera División players
Club Deportivo Universidad Católica footballers
Competitors at the 2022 South American Games
21st-century Chilean people